The enzyme lipid-phosphate phosphatase (EC 3.1.3.76) catalyzes the reaction

(9S,10S)-10-hydroxy-9-(phosphonooxy)octadecanoate + H2O  (9S,10S)-9,10-dihydroxyoctadecanoate + phosphate

This enzyme belongs to the family of hydrolases, specifically those acting on phosphoric monoester bonds.  The systematic name is (9S,10S)-10-hydroxy-9-(phosphonooxy)octadecanoate phosphohydrolase. Other names in common use include hydroxy fatty acid phosphatase, dihydroxy fatty acid phosphatase, hydroxy lipid phosphatase, sEH (ambiguous), and soluble epoxide hydrolase (ambiguous).

References

 
 
 
 
 

EC 3.1.3
Enzymes of unknown structure